Malcolm Frager (January 15, 1935June 20, 1991) was an American piano virtuoso and recording artist.

Life and career
Frager was born in St. Louis, Missouri and studied with Carl Friedberg in New York City from 1949 until Friedberg's death in 1955. In 1957 he graduated magna cum laude and Phi Beta Kappa from Columbia University with a major in Russian. He won the Piano Competition in Geneva (1955), the Michaels Memorial Award in Chicago (1956), the Leventritt Competition in New York City (1959), and the Queen Elisabeth Music Competition in Brussels (1960).

He made his Carnegie Hall debut in November 1960, performing Prokofiev's Piano Sonata No. 6.

His Grammy-nominated debut recording with RCA Victor Red Seal was Prokofiev's Piano Concerto No. 2 in G minor, Op. 16 and Haydn's Sonata No. 35 in E-flat. He recorded music by Mozart, Haydn, Chopin, Schumann, Beethoven, Brahms and Prokofiev. Frager regularly programmed the two piano concertos and numerous solo works by Carl Maria von Weber, as well as the keyboard compositions of C. P. E. Bach.

He completed acclaimed musical tours of Southern Africa in 1976 and 1978 

Frager's personal library is now housed at the Sibley Library Special Collections at the Eastman School of Music in Rochester, New York. His discovery of manuscripts includes a version of the Fantasie in A minor that later became the first movement of the Piano Concerto in A minor by Schumann. He premiered this with the Boston Symphony Orchestra under Erich Leinsdorf at the Tanglewood Festival in August 1968. He also unearthed and performed the original version of Tchaikovsky's Piano Concerto No. 1, which Nikolai Rubinstein had criticised so unmercifully as to cause the composer to withdraw the intended dedication to him. In 1978 Frager visited the Jagiellonian Library in Kraków, Poland where he persuaded librarians to make available a cache of more than one thousand original manuscripts missing (and believed lost) since World War II. The collection included pieces by Bach, Beethoven, Schumann and Mozart. In 1987 Frager received the Golden Mozart Pin from the International Mozart Foundation in Salzburg. Mr Frager performed Mozart Piano Concerto Nr19 with Nikolaus Harnoncourt and the Concertgebouw Orchestra in 1983.

Frager was brought up in a Jewish family, but later converted to Christian Science. He died in Pittsfield, Massachusetts on June 20, 1991.  His family declined to state the cause of death, but he was reported to have been ill for about a year.

References

1935 births
1991 deaths
American classical pianists
Male classical pianists
American male pianists
American Christian Scientists
Leventritt Award winners
Musicians from St. Louis
Prize-winners of the Queen Elisabeth Competition
20th-century classical pianists
20th-century classical musicians
American people of Jewish descent
Jewish classical pianists
20th-century American pianists
Converts to Christian Science from Judaism
Classical musicians from Missouri
20th-century American male musicians